Metroid is a video game series published by Nintendo and primarily produced by the company's first-party developers, though second-party Fuse Games and third-party Team Ninja have also developed for the series. All Metroid video games have been developed exclusively for Nintendo video game consoles and handhelds, dating from the Nintendo Entertainment System to the current generation of video game consoles. The franchise consists of eleven video games, the latest of which was released in 2021. Comics, manga adaptations, and soundtracks have also been released.

The series revolves around Samus Aran, a bounty hunter who protects the galaxy from the Space Pirates and their attempts to harness the power of fictional organisms, especially the eponymous Metroids. The series' gameplay contains elements from shooter, platforming, and adventure games. It is known for its non-linear progression and solitary exploration. The 2D Metroid games are side-scrollers, and the 3D Metroid Prime series gives the player a first-person perspective, while Other M is a third-person shooter with the ability to switch to first-person view. Metroid is one of Nintendo's most successful franchises, with over 17 million copies sold by September 2012. The games have received varying levels of critical acclaim.

Video games

Metroid series

Metroid Prime series

Soundtracks

Printed media

Comic books

Manga

Notes

References

External links
 Official Metroid website
 Metroid comics and manga at the Metroid Database

Media
Media lists by video games franchise
Mass media by franchise
Nintendo-related lists